The Alderney Race is a strait that runs between Alderney and Cap de la Hague, a cape at the northwestern tip of the Cotentin Peninsula in Normandy. A strong current runs through the race north of the Passage de la Déroute, a treacherous passage separating the Cotentin from the Channel Islands. The current is intermittent, varying with the tide, and can run up to about  during equinoctial tides. The French call it Raz Blanchard. In Norman French it is called L'Raz.

Location 

The Alderney Race is eight nautical miles across and located roughly between Alderney, in the Bailiwick of Guernsey, and La Hague, France.  It constitutes the northeastern limit of the Gulf of Saint-Malo.

Sea conditions 
When the wind and the race current flow in opposite directions, the sea becomes particularly chaotic: wave heights can reach four metres and have wavelengths smaller than 50 metres. The waves break with violence, thus making shipping conditions particularly dangerous. On the contrary, when the wind and the stream flow in the same direction, the sea becomes calm, provided that the tidal coefficient is not too great.

The uneven seabed – both Alderney and La Hague lie in the Armorican Massif – makes the situation more complicated. Poor weather conditions can produce abundant wind-blown foam, making visibility poor. During good weather conditions, opposing wind and currents can cause breaking waves, especially at Banc de la Schôle and at Longis Bay in Alderney.

Hydrology 
The power of the current comes from the narrowness of the strait and from the fact that there is a two-metre tidal height difference between Carteret and La Hague as well as between la Hague and Cherbourg.

Tidal power 
Because of the enormous potential it sees in tidal power, the French government plans to use tidal turbines to tap the energy of the Race.

References

See also 
 
 

Geography of Normandy
Tidal power in France
Geography of Alderney
Articles containing video clips